Law & Order (often referred to as Law and Order) is a British television crime drama series, comprising four connected plays written by G. F. Newman and directed by Les Blair, which was first transmitted on 6 April 1978 on BBC Two. Each of the four stories within the series were told from a different perspective, including that of the Detective, the Villain, the Brief and the Prisoner. The series was highly controversial upon its release due to its depiction of a corrupt British law enforcement and legal system.

In 2009, G.F. Newman stated that he considered "90% of police to be corrupt at the time, and that there has been no significant change since then." For the series' thirtieth anniversary in April 2008, it was released on a limited edition DVD via 2|Entertain. In April 2018, BBC Four announced that the series would be rebroadcast on television for the first time to mark the series' fortieth anniversary. This statement was inaccurate, as a full repeat had previously been broadcast on BBC4 from 24 March to 14 April 2009 and it had also been repeated in March 1980. The 2018 repeats began at 10:00pm on Thursdays from 12 April 2018.

Cast
 Peter Dean as Jack Lynn
 Derek Martin as D.I. Fred Pyall
 Deirdre Costello as Cathy Lynn
 Billy Cornelius as D.S. Eric Lethridge
 Alan Ford as Clifford Harding
 Ken Campbell as Alex Gladwell
 Fred Haggerty as D.C.I. Tony Simmons
 Geoffrey Todd as D.C. Peter Fenton
 Alan Davidson as Benny Isaacs
 Tony Barouch as Collin Coleman

A Detective's Tale
 David Stockton as D.S. Tony Shields
 Tom De-Ville as D.I. Frank Polden
 John Hogan as D.S. Ian Middlewick
 Chris Hallam as D.S. Lewis
 Steve Kelly as Maurice Dickinson
 Billy Dean as David Shepley
 Stanley Price as Brian Finch
 Roy Sone as Micky Fielder
 Cy Wallis as Billy Little
 David Harris as Witness
 Val Clover as Telephonist
 Michael Sheard as Insurance Assessor
 Byron Sotiris as Duty Sergeant
 Stewart Harwood as P.C. Malcolm

A Villain's Tale
 Colin Howells as D.C. Roger Humphreys
 Robert Oates as D.C. Warren Salter
 Johnny Feltwell as D.C. Matthew Hall
 Alan Clarke as D.C. Ray Jenkins
 Mike Horsburgh as D.I. Graham McHale
 Doug Sheldon as D.S. Jack Barcy
 Mike Cummings as Tommy Haines
 John Bardon as Del Rogers
 Alf Coster as Philip Hayes
 Barry Summerford as John Tully
 John Blackburn as Security Guard

A Brief's Tale
 Terence Bayler as Michel Messick Q.C.
 André van Gyseghem as Judge Robert Quigley
 Michael Griffiths as Horace McMillan Q.C.
 Peter Welch as Brian Harpenden-Smith Q.C.
 Jeffrey Segal as Stanley Eaton Q.C.
 Peter Craze as T.D.C. Peter Footring
 Jason White as D.C. Simon Brent
 Barry Summerford as John Tully
 Frank Henson as Frank Ryan
 Mark Gordon as Mr. English
 Jean Leppard as Margaret Lloyd

A Prisoner's Tale
 Lloyd McGuire as P.O. Jordan
 Graham Gough as P.O. Powell
 Ronan Paterson as P.O. Westbury
 Dave Atkins as P.O. Dorman
 Roger Booth as Chief Officer Carne
 Harry Walker as Dr Eynshaw
 Bruce White as Bob Mark
 Robert Bill as Micky Dunkerton
 Myles Reitherman as Mervyn Latimer
 Stanley McGeagh as Trevor Reid
 Gilbert MacIntyre as Baylis
 Laurence Foster as Senior Officer Walters
 Stanley Illsley as Visiting Committee
 Terry Yorke as Police Sergeant, A.10
 Dominic Allan as Inspector Chatt, A.10
 Alf Roberts as Prison Officer, Punishment Block
 Ian Munro as Prison Officer, Punishment Block
 Mark Warren as Prison Officer, Legal Visiting Room
 Colin Taylor as Prison Officer, Visiting Room
 Max Latimer as Prison Officer, Visiting Room
 Harry Landis as M.P.
 Pauline Wynn as Visiting Committee

Episodes

Critical reception
The series was highly controversial upon its release due to its depiction of a corrupt British law enforcement and legal system. There was such an outcry regarding the series in the British press that the BBC was prevented from trying to sell the series abroad.

John Cooper, QC, writing in The Times, described the series as 'Seismic', continuing to say that 'at the time [the plays] provoked calls from MPs for Newman to be arrested for sedition and the summoning of the director-general of the BBC to the Home Office to explain himself.'

A review by Matteo Sedazzari in May 2018 concluded: 'it’s such a shame that the BBC seriously do not produce dramas like this anymore, thought-provoking, brutal and powerful', and Adam Sweeting in The Spectator described it as 'compellingly plausible'.

Jasper Rees wrote for the Arts Desk in May 2018 'Law and Order more than earns this 40th-anniversary trip down memory’s stinking back alley'.

The series was discussed on BBC Radio 4's programme Thinking Allowed on 23 May 2018, with the host Laurie Taylor talking to criminologist Tim Newburn and Charlotte Brunsden, Professor of Film & Television Studies at the University of Warwick, along with the author, to engage with the question of 'the extent to which... [the series] created a public and political debate which produced positive reform'.

Among the series' successors was the BBC TV series Police.

Book series

In parallel, the 'Law & Order' series of books was a trilogy of works written by Newman, first published by Sphere in 1977 and then reprinted in Sphere Paperbacks in 1978. The trilogy consists of 'A Detective's Tale', 'A Villain's Tale', and 'A Prisoner's Tale', . An omnibus edition including all three was published in 1984 by HarperCollins .

References

External links
 

1978 British television series debuts
1978 British television series endings
1970s British police procedural television series
1970s British television miniseries
1970s British legal television series
English-language television shows
Police corruption in fiction